The Yasar Dogu Tournament 2003, was a wrestling event held in Ankara, Turkey between 28 February and 2 March 2003. This tournament was held as 31st.

This international tournament includes competition includes competition in men's  freestyle wrestling. This ranking tournament was held in honor of the two time Olympic Champion, Yaşar Doğu.

Medal table

Medal overview

Men's freestyle

Participating nations

References 

Yasar Dogu 2003
2003 in sport wrestling
Sports competitions in Ankara
Yaşar Doğu Tournament
International wrestling competitions hosted by Turkey